Harmandeep Singh, also named Harry Khara, is an equestrian from India. He is a keen rider having an experience of almost ten years in this field.

Biography
Singh was schooled at Delhi and Calcutta. He has played many championships all over India and has represented India abroad in other countries also. He has been an All India National champion several times and also was declared as the state champion (showjumping) in 2013 during the State games by the Bengal Olympic association. Being a successful rider, he has been able to carry the days in several championships nationwide. He is further nominated as a member of Indian Team. He is the youngest Indian to win the international. (record).

Throughout the journey he has been excelling in Showjumping, Dressage and Tent pegging. In the last few years he has been continuously winning the medals in the championships and horse shows. By riding thoroughbreds and coached by an exceptional international rider has the Asian Games as his target as of now. Apart from this he is very much into music and has worked as a lead drummer in a number of Delhi-based leading bands.

He is sponsored by the leading Indian and international companies such as Indian oil, Equestrian Clearance etc. (EFI & GOVT. Of Punjab/central)

References

Living people
Year of birth missing (living people)